Victor Viktorovich Barîșev (born 3 July 1978) is a Moldovan former footballer who played as a midfielder.

Club career
Barîșev spent most of his career in Moldova, but also played in Ukraine, Azerbaijan and Uzbekistan.

International career
Barîșev made his debut for the Moldova national team on 9 February 2002 in a friendly match against Lithuania. He made 13 appearances in total for Moldova between 2002 and 2005.

Personal life
His father, Victor Yurievich Barîșev, was a footballer and football coach in the Soviet Union and Moldova.

References

External links
 

1978 births
Living people
Association football midfielders
Moldovan footballers
Moldova international footballers
CS Tiligul-Tiras Tiraspol players
FC Nistru Cioburciu players
FC Sheriff Tiraspol players
FC Nistru Otaci players
FC Tiraspol players
FC Arsenal Kharkiv players
FC Kharkiv players
FK MKT Araz players
FC Iskra-Stal players
FC Qizilqum Zarafshon players
Moldovan Super Liga players
Ukrainian First League players
Ukrainian Premier League players
Azerbaijan Premier League players
Uzbekistan Super League players
Moldovan expatriate footballers
Moldovan expatriate sportspeople in Ukraine
Expatriate footballers in Ukraine
Moldovan expatriate sportspeople in Azerbaijan
Expatriate footballers in Azerbaijan
Moldovan expatriate sportspeople in Uzbekistan
Expatriate footballers in Uzbekistan